The ruddy-tailed flycatcher (Terenotriccus erythrurus) is a small passerine bird in the family Tityridae. It breeds in lowlands from southeastern Mexico to northern Bolivia, north-central Brazil and the Guianas. This flycatcher ranges east of the Andes cordillera into the entire Amazon Basin of northern Brazil and the Guianas; to the west of the Andes in Colombia and Ecuador into Central America. It is the only member of the genus Terenotriccus, but some authorities place it in genus Myiobius.  However, it differs in voice, behaviour, and structure from members of that group.

The nest is a pear-shaped pouch of plant fibres and leaves with a visored side entrance, built by the female 2–6 m high in the undergrowth and suspended from a twig or vine. The two chocolate-blotched white eggs are incubated by the female for 15–16 days to hatching, the male playing no part in the care of the eggs or young.

The upperparts are grey-olive, with a rufous rump, tail, wings and eye ring. The throat is buff and the breast is cinnamon, becoming pale buff on the belly. Sexes are similar, but young birds are brighter above and have a browner tail and breast.

The ruddy-tailed flycatcher is mainly solitary, and only occasionally joins mixed-species feeding flocks. It feeds on  insects, especially leafhoppers, picked from foliage or taken in acrobatic aerial pursuit.

This species has a  see-oo see call, and a repetitive eek eek eek eek eek song.  It sometimes flicks both wings up to make a faint whirring sound.

References

Further reading

External links
Ruddy-tailed flycatcher photo gallery VIREO

ruddy-tailed flycatcher
Birds of Mexico
Birds of Central America
Birds of the Amazon Basin
Birds of Venezuela
Birds of Colombia
Birds of Ecuador
Birds of the Guianas
ruddy-tailed flycatcher
Birds of Brazil